Chaitanya Singha Dev was the fifty-sixth king of the Mallabhum (in present-day West Bengal, India). He ruled from 1748 to 1801 CE.  After 1780 the capital, Bishnupur, was controlled by the Collector of the East India Company.

References

Sources
 

 

Malla rulers
Kings of Mallabhum
18th-century Indian monarchs
Mallabhum